Playa blanca is a 1976 Sven Ingvars studio album. In 1993, it was rereleased as CD.

Track listing
Playa blanca – Alric Simone, Stan Regal, Åke Strömmer
Farväl till sommaren – Lasse Berghagen
Number One – Billy Swan, Marlu Swan
Alpens ros – trad
Leende guldbruna ögon (Beautiful Brown EyesLeende guldbruna ögon) – Alton Delmore, Athur Simon, Olle Bergman
Sen jag mötte dig (Smoke Gets in Your Eyes) – Jerome Kern, Lars-E. Karlsson
Stina kom till mit party – Mats Wickén
Försök förlåta mej – Rune Wallebom
När solen färgar juninatten – Sven-Erik Magnusson, Torleif Styffe
Rock and Roll Music – Chuck Berry
Per spelman – trad. Norwegian folksong
En hård värld (Wild World) – Cat Stevens, Hawkey Franzén
Aj, aj, Maria (Maria de bahia) – Paul Misraki, Roland

1993 bonus tracks
Dansen går fru Andersson – Sven-Erik Magnusson, Per Levin
En sådan sommar får vi aldrig mer igen – Torleif Styffe, Leif Nygren
Du är just den jag vill ha (I Can't Keep My Hands Off You) – Freddie Hart, Sven Olof Bagge
Jag har e litta jänte – trad.
Tur i kärlek (Good Luck Charm) – Aaron Schroeder, Wally Gold, Olle Bergman
Räkna aldrig någon tår – Robert Malmberg, Sven Olof Bagge

Charts

References

External links 

 

1976 albums
Philips Records albums
Sven-Ingvars albums